The 1978 Daytona 500, the 20th running of the event, was the second race of the 1978 NASCAR Winston Cup season. It was held on February 19 at Daytona International Speedway in Daytona Beach, Florida. Defending winner Cale Yarborough won the pole and Bobby Allison won the race.

Race report
The race began with Richard Petty, who brought a brand new Dodge Magnum to the race, leading early. Starting in sixth place, Petty quickly went out in front and led 32 out of the first 60 laps, all under green. The first 60 laps were run at an average speed of nearly 180 mph. But on the lap 61, Petty cut a left rear tire and spun out, collecting long-time rival David Pearson and Darrell Waltrip.

Track conditions were very "green" that day, due to heavy rains during the week. Just after the restart on lap 70, Parsons blew a left rear tire and spun out. Behind him, 1972 race winner A. J. Foyt was caught up and flipped several times in the turn 1 infield. That left the race to three drivers, 1977 race winner and polesitter Cale Yarborough,
Buddy Baker and Bobby Allison, who entered the race with a 67-race winless streak. Yarborough dropped out with engine problems. With 11 laps remaining, Baker, dueling with Allison, suffered an engine failure. Allison drove his Bud Moore Ford Thunderbird around Baker to take the lead and capture his first Daytona 500 win.

It was the lowest starting position (33rd) that a driver had won the event, until 2007 when Kevin Harvick started one spot further back than Allison. 1978 would be final year for the AMC Matador with Jocko Maggiacomo's entry. First Daytona 500 starts for Bill Elliott, Blackie Wangerin, Morgan Shepherd, and Harry Gant. Only Daytona 500 starts for Roger Hamby, Roland Wlodyka, Jerry Jolly, Claude Ballot-Léna, and Al Holbert. Last Daytona 500 starts for Ron Hutcherson, Ferrel Harris, Skip Manning, Dick May, Jimmy Lee Capps, and Joe Mihalic.

Denver racer Jerry Jolly made his NASCAR Winston Cup debut and finished 20th, his best in the series. This would be the only one of his five Winston Cup starts where he was running at the finish. This was done in spite of a cut tire on the 92nd lap that started a four-car incident that also involved the cars of Cecil Gordon, Jimmy Lee Capps, and Tighe Scott. All four were running at the finish of a race that had a remarkably low amount of attrition for a race of that era. Only 14 of the 41 cars that started failed to make it to the finish, with a high percentage of those who failed to make it to the finish being some of the sport's top drivers.

Last Daytona 500 until the 2019 Daytona 500 without an Earnhardt in the field.

Notable crew chiefs who participated in this race included Darrell Bryant, Junie Donlavey, Jake Elder, Joey Arrington, Herb Nab, Dale Inman, Bud Moore and Harry Hyde.

Top 10 finishers

References

Daytona 500
Daytona 500
Daytona 500
NASCAR races at Daytona International Speedway